Mladen Romić (23 May 1962 – 19 January 2006) was a Croatian football player.

Club career
As a player, he spent much of his career, nine seasons in total, with HNK Rijeka. While playing for NK Pomorac in 2002, at the age of 39, he became the oldest player to have played in Prva HNL. Since then, he has been overtaken by Davor Vugrinec and Jakov Surać.

International career
He made his debut for Croatia in a July 1992 friendly match away against Australia and earned a total of 3 caps, scoring no goals, all during the tour of Australia. His final international was a week later against the same opposition.

Post-playing career
Between 2003 and his premature death due to illness in 2006, he was sporting director of HNK Rijeka. Rijeka's fans, Armada Rijeka, created a mural near Stadion Kantrida in his honour to commemorate his contribution to the club.

Honours
Bremerhaven
Verbandsliga Bremen: 1993-94

NK Zadar
Prva B HNL promotion: 1995-96

NK Pomorac
Druga HNL promotion: 2000-01
3. HNL - West: 1998-99

Individual
NK Rijeka player of the season: 1991-92

Statistics

Player

References

External links
 
Profile leksikon

1962 births
2006 deaths
Sportspeople from Livno
Croats of Bosnia and Herzegovina
Association football defenders
Yugoslav footballers
Croatian footballers
Croatia international footballers
NK Troglav 1918 Livno players
NK Dubrava players
NK Zagreb players
HNK Rijeka players
FC Bremerhaven players
NK Zadar players
NK Pomorac 1921 players
Yugoslav First League players
Yugoslav Second League players
Croatian Football League players
Regionalliga players
First Football League (Croatia) players
Second Football League (Croatia) players
Croatian expatriate footballers
Expatriate footballers in Germany
Croatian expatriate sportspeople in Germany
HNK Rijeka non-playing staff